Cundinamarca is a department of Colombia, one of the original nine states of the "United States of Colombia". 

As with the other states, Cundinamarca once had the right to issue its own postage stamps, and it issued stamps with the state's coat of arms, starting in 1870 and ending in 1904. Many of these are still readily available. There is one rarity, the 2-real provisional stamp from 1883, although there is some doubt as to whether it was sold to the public, since no used copies are known to exist. Likewise, authentic uses of any Cundinamarca stamp on cover are not often seen.

Sources
 Stanley Gibbons Ltd, various catalogues
Rossiter, Stuart & John Flower. The Stamp Atlas. London: Macdonald, 1986. 
 XLCR Stamp Finder and Collector's Dictionary, Thomas Cliffe Ltd, c.1960

Further reading
 Alan D. Angon, 1883 – The Typeset Provisionals of Cundinamarca, 1972  
 Howard Frome, Manuscript Cancels of Cundinamarca, 1993 
 Dieter Bortfeldt, The workbook: notes on reprints and forgeries of Colombian stamps. Part II, The sovereign states of Colombia, Antioquia, Bolivar, Boyacá, Cundinamarca, Tolima and Panamá, Colombian Philatelic Research Society, Bogota, 2007

External links
 AskPhil – Glossary of Stamp Collecting Terms
 Encyclopaedia of Postal Authorities
Colombia-Panama Philatelic Study Group

Philately of Colombia
Cundinamarca Department

br:Timbroù Stadoù-Unanet Kolombia